Al Campbell is a singer.

Al Campbell may also refer to:

Al Campbell (keyboard player)

See also
Alan Campbell (disambiguation)
Albert Campbell (disambiguation)
Alfred Campbell (disambiguation)